Chitaman Gupte (1916 – 24 April 1994) was an Indian cricketer who played for Maharashtra. He died in Pune.

Gupte made a single first-class appearance for the side, during the 1940–41 season, against Baroda. From the opening order, he scored 32 runs in the first innings in which he batted, and 21 runs in the second.

He took a single catch, that of Hemu Adhikari.

External links
Chitaman Gupte at Cricket Archive 

1916 births
1994 deaths
Indian cricketers
Maharashtra cricketers